Verbena halei, commonly known as Texas vervain, Texas verbena, or slender verbena, is a flowering plant in the vervain family, Verbenaceae. It is native to much of the southern United States and Mexico. Scattered populations have been found along the east coast (North Carolina), and its range stretches south to Florida, west to Arizona, and throughout most of Mexico. It is a perennial shrub and grows in thickets and woodland borders. Flowers bloom March to June. It has been introduced to Australia, in Queensland, New South Wales, Victoria, and South Australia.

It was first formally named by American botanist John Kunkel Small in 1898. It is sometimes considered a subspecies or variety of Verbena officinalis.

References

halei
Flora of the Southeastern United States
Flora of the South-Central United States
Flora of Arizona
Flora of Oklahoma
Flora of Missouri
Flora without expected TNC conservation status